Maxwell "Max" Brooks Tullman (born August 22, 1997) is an American professional stock car racing driver. He last competed part-time in the NASCAR Xfinity Series, driving the No. 13 Toyota Supra for MBM Motorsports and the No. 53 Chevrolet Camaro for Jimmy Means Racing.

Early life
Tullman’s racing career began at the age of 11 in Quarter Midgets. He has been racing in the IMSA Porsche GT3 Cup Series since 2015.

Racing career

Xfinity Series
Tullman plans to run three races in the Xfinity Series, driving the No. 26 Ford Mustang for Tullman-Walker Racing. He ran his first Xfinity at Iowa, where he finished 30th due to a crash. In his other starts, he finished 23rd at Las Vegas, and failed to qualify at Kansas in the fall, and 25th at Homestead.

Tullman joined MBM Motorsports to drive the No. 13 Toyota for the season opener at Daytona.

Camping World Truck Series
In April, Tullman signed a partial NASCAR Camping World Truck Series schedule with Young's Motorsports.

Tullman made his NASCAR debut in the Truck Series in 2018, driving the No. 20 Chevrolet Silverado for Young’s Motorsports at Chicagoland. He finished 23rd after starting 21st.

He also competed in the Truck Series event at Canadian Tire Motorsport Park.

He earned a season-high ninth-place finish at Talladega (Ala.) Superspeedway in October in a third Young's Motorsports truck. He was the highest finishing driver for the organization ahead of mainstay driver Austin Hill and development driver Tanner Thorson.

K&N Pro Series West
Tullman ran three races in 2017 in the No. 27 Ford. His best finish was 9th at Bakersfield.

K&N Pro Series East
Tullman had run a total of two races, one each in 2017 and 2018. He ran both races in the No. 27 Ford and finished 9th at Millville in 2017 and 15th at Bristol in 2018.

ARCA Racing Series
In 2018, Tullman ran eight races in the No. 78 Chevrolet for Mason Mitchell Motorsports. His best performance was at Daytona, where he finished 6th after starting 4th.

He also finished sixth at Talladega (Ala.) Superspeedway. He led laps in both restrictor plate races. Tyler Green, son of former NASCAR driver Mark Green and spotter for Jamie McMurray in the Monster Energy NASCAR Cup Series served as the spotter.

Personal life
Tullman is the son of Steve Tullman who currently owns Tullman-Walker Racing.

Motorsports career results

NASCAR
(key) (Bold – Pole position awarded by time. Italics – Pole position earned by points standings. * – Most laps led.)

Xfinity Series

Camping World Truck Series

K&N Pro Series East

K&N Pro Series West

 Season still in progress
 Ineligible for series points
 Tullman began the 2018 season racing for Truck Series points but switched to Xfinity Series points before the race at Las Vegas II.

ARCA Racing Series

References

External links
 

Living people
1997 births
NASCAR drivers
ARCA Menards Series drivers
Racing drivers from Pennsylvania